Sylvio Luiz Perez Machado de Souza (born July 14, 1934) is a Brazilian sports commentator and television presenter.

References

External links
  

1934 births
Brazilian sports broadcasters
Brazilian television presenters
Association football commentators
Living people